The Burghead transmitting station is a broadcasting facility near Burghead in Scotland for long wave and medium wave radio transmission that started service on 12 October 1936. The site is owned by Arqiva and houses a long wave radio transmitter on 198 kHz broadcasting BBC Radio 4 and two medium wave radio transmitters, broadcasting BBC Radio 5 Live on 693 kHz and BBC Radio Scotland on 810 kHz. The long wave transmitter is part of a network transmitting on the same frequency, the other transmitters being Droitwich and Westerglen.

The station has three masts, which are all lattice structures with triangular cross section and insulated against ground. One of the large masts is used for the medium wave transmissions and the other is used for the long wave transmitter. The third and smallest mast is the backup antenna.

The original building was demolished leaving a much smaller building for the more modern transmitters.

Services available

Analogue radio (AM long wave)

Analogue radio (AM medium wave)

See also
 Arqiva, who own the site
 List of masts
 List of tallest buildings and structures in Great Britain
 List of radio stations in the United Kingdom

References

External links
 The Transmission Gallery – Photographs & Information

Radio in the United Kingdom
Transmitter sites in Scotland
Towers in Scotland
Buildings and structures in Moray
Burghead